Dyurso may refer to:
Dyurso River, a river in Krasnodar Krai, Russia, near the selo of Abrau-Dyurso
Dyurso (rural locality), a rural locality (a khutor) in Krasnodar Krai, Russia